Goran Ćakić (born 21 May 1980) is a Serbian professional basketball executive and former player. He is currently working as a team manager in Mega Basket.

Playing career 
Ćakić was selected to play at 2000 Nike Hoop Summit in Indianapolis. He represented Serbia at University games in 1999 where he won silver and 2001 where he won gold medal. He was also member of Serbian U20 team at FIBA Europe Under-20 Championship in 2000.

References

External links
 Goran Ćakić at beobasket.net
 Goran Ćakić at euroleague.net
 Goran Ćakić at eurobasket.com

1980 births
Living people
ABA League players
Apollon Patras B.C. players
Basketball players from Belgrade
Bandırma B.İ.K. players
BC Astana players
BC Azovmash players
KK Beobanka players
KK Budućnost players
KK Crvena zvezda players
BC Khimik players
KK Mega Basket players
KK Partizan players
Power forwards (basketball)
BKK Radnički players
Serbian basketball executives and administrators
Serbian expatriate basketball people in France
Serbian expatriate basketball people in Greece
Serbian expatriate basketball people in Italy
Serbian expatriate basketball people in Kazakhstan
Serbian expatriate basketball people in Montenegro
Serbian expatriate basketball people in Turkey
Serbian expatriate basketball people in Ukraine
Serbian men's basketball players
SLUC Nancy Basket players
Victoria Libertas Pallacanestro players
Universiade medalists in basketball
Universiade gold medalists for Serbia and Montenegro
Medalists at the 2001 Summer Universiade